Paraluteres is a genus of filefishes native to the Indian and Pacific Oceans.

Species
There are currently 2 recognized species in this genus:
 Paraluteres arqat E. Clark & Gohar, 1953
 Paraluteres prionurus Bleeker, 1851 (false puffer)

References

Monacanthidae
Marine fish genera
Taxa named by Pieter Bleeker